Mikheil Batiashvili is a Georgian politician. He was minister of Education, Science, Culture and Sport of Georgia from 12 July 2018 to 7 November 2019, when he resigned.

References 

Educators from Georgia (country)
Tbilisi State University alumni
Politicians from Georgia (country)
Government ministers of Georgia (country)
1971 births
Living people